Cecil Newton, Jr. (born 1986), is an American football center.

Cecil Newton may also refer to:

Cecil Newton (Coronation Street), a fictional character
Cecil Newton, Sr., father of NFL quarterback Cam Newton